Anthony A. "Tony" Strickland (born February 17, 1970) is an American politician. He was voted mayor of Huntington Beach by the Huntington Beach City Council in December 2022. He is a former California State Senator who represented the 19th District from 2008-2012. Strickland is a member of the Republican Party and a former Assemblyman, representing the 37th District from 1998 to 2004. He is the President and CEO of Strong America, an advocacy group and PAC.

Early life, education, and early political career
Strickland was born at Fort Ord, California, when his father, Don, was stationed there as a soldier in the United States Army. Don Strickland met his wife, Antonie, when he was stationed in Germany.  Don and Antonie Strickland moved to Ventura County with their son Tony in 1973. Strickland earned his Bachelor of Arts in political science at Whittier College, where he earned the Leadership and Service Award and was a Nixon Scholar.

From 1996 to 1997, Strickland served on the staff of Assemblyman Tom McClintock.

California Assembly

Elections
Strickland was first elected to the Assembly in 1998 with 49% of the vote in a three-way race.  He was re-elected in 2000 with 51% of the vote again in a three-way race.  He was re-elected to a third term with 63.1% of the vote in  2002. Term limits prevented Strickland from seeking a fourth term in 2004. Audra Strickland, his then-wife, decided to run for the seat and won (she was re-elected in 2006 and 2008).

Committee assignments
During his time in the Assembly, Strickland was Chairman of the Assembly Republican Caucus, the second-highest-ranking position for a Republican in the Assembly.  During his three terms, he was also Vice-Chairman of the Assembly Governmental Organization Committee and was also a member of the Assembly Committees on Banking and Finance; Elections, Redistricting, and Constitutional Amendments; Higher Education; and Arts, Entertainment, Sports, Tourism, and Internet Media. Also, he served on the Assembly Republican Education Reform Task Force, which developed several education reform proposals that were rejected.

2006 run for State Controller

In 2006 Strickland ran for State Controller. He won 41% of the vote in a four-way primary, besting State Senator Abel Maldonado, his nearest opponent, who received 37.0% of the vote. Strickland was defeated by John Chiang in the general election by a 50.7%-40.2% margin.

California Senate

2008 election
Strickland ran in California's 19th district against the Democratic nominee, former state Assemblywoman Hannah-Beth Jackson.  Senate District 19 includes areas of Santa Barbara, Ventura,  and Los Angeles counties. The race was highly competitive and the closest state Senate race in California that year.

The race was also contentious, with critics of Strickland upset at the alleged misrepresentations of his business background.  On various campaign literature, the Strickland campaign portrayed Strickland as a vice president of Green Wave Energy Solutions, LLC—even though Strickland has worked in politics his entire adult life, and Green Wave Energy Solutions LLC has not done any business in California.

Jackson conceded just five days before Strickland was sworn into the Senate. He had won the election by 900 votes. With Tony Strickland's 2008 election to the State Senate and his wife, Audra, simultaneously winning re-election to the State Assembly, the Stricklands became the second husband and wife to serve concurrently in the California State Legislature (after Senator George Runner and Assemblywoman Sharon Runner).

Committee assignments
Environmental Quality (Vice-Chair)
Health (Vice-Chair)
Energy, Utilities, and Communications
Governmental Organization
Human Services
Health (Vice Chair)

2010 State Controller election

In the June 2010 primary, Strickland won 60% of the vote to gain the Republican nomination for State Controller, setting up a rematch of the 2006 Controller election between Strickland and Chiang, who was unopposed in his bid for the Democratic nomination for re-election as State Controller.  In the general election, Strickland lost again to Chiang, this time by a wider margin: Chiang received 55% of the vote, while Strickland received 36%.

2012 congressional election

In January 2012, Strickland announced his candidacy in the newly redrawn California's 26th congressional district, based in Ventura County. Strickland was defeated by Democrat Julia Brownley on November 6, 2012.

2014 congressional election

Congressman Howard "Buck" McKeon, who represented California's 25th congressional district since 1993, retired and endorsed Strickland. He was also endorsed by former Republican candidate for president, Mitt Romney, and vice presidential candidate Paul Ryan. He ran against then California State Senator Steve Knight on November 4, 2014, and was defeated. California's 25th congressional district covers northern parts of Los Angeles County and parts of Ventura County. It includes the cities of Santa Clarita, Simi Valley, Palmdale, and Lancaster, and the northern part of the San Fernando Valley.

Campaign law and other issues 
In 1998, Strickland distributed flyers in his campaign for the California Assembly claiming Camarillo Mayor Charlotte Craven endorsed him. Strickland was not endorsed by Craven and the mayor requested that Strickland remove her name from the flyer. With Craven's name removed, only one elected official, Mike Markey, had endorsed Strickland.

In 1998, the Strickland campaign had a complaint filed against it alleging that a mailer sent out by an independent group attacking Strickland's opponent coordinated with the campaign. The complaint was made by the President of the West Valley Republican Club, Michael Chulak. He claimed that the mailer was illegal because it was sent out "at the behest" of the Strickland campaign. The mailer was sent out by a Sacramento-based gun owner's group on Strickland's behalf.

In December 1999, Tony Strickland was sued by the secretary of state over failure to report $116,140 in late contributions, a violation of the Political Reform Act of 1974. It resulted in a fine of $6,000.
 	
In April 2010 the California Fair Political Practices Commission decided that Tony Strickland and Strickland for State Senate, a member of the California State Senate, and his candidate-controlled committee sent out a mass mailing without the name of the committee on the outside of the mailing. The Commission levied a $3,000 fine.

Personal life
Strickland married his wife Carla Dispalatro Strickland on February 17, 2019. Strickland has one daughter, Ruby Ruth, and one son, Anthony Paul.

References

External links
 
 Official campaign website
 
Join California Tony Strickland

1970 births
Living people
American people of German descent
American energy industry executives
Mayors of Huntington Beach, California
Republican Party California state senators
Republican Party members of the California State Assembly
People from Moorpark, California
Whittier College alumni
21st-century American politicians